Pablo Ronquillo was a  Cuban baseball outfielder in the Cuban League. He played for 7 years (1885–1891). Ronquillo played with the Habana club. He was elected to the Cuban Baseball Hall of Fame in 1954.

References

Cuban League players
Negro league baseball managers
Azul (baseball) players
Almendares (baseball) players
Habana players
Baseball outfielders